The 1959 Howard Bulldogs football team was an American football team that represented Howard College (now known as the Samford University) as an independent during the 1959 NCAA College Division football season. In their first year under head coach Bobby Bowden, the team compiled an 9–1 record and defeated Gordon Military College in the Textile Bowl. In May 1959, Bowden was hired as head coach of the Bulldogs.

Schedule

References

Howard
Samford Bulldogs football seasons
Howard Bulldogs football